Quadra Mountain is located on the border of Alberta and British Columbia on the Continental Divide. It was named in 1910 by Arthur Oliver Wheeler. The name refers to the mountain's four pinnacles. However, in 1952 the form of the name was changed to Mount Quadra in the mistaken belief that it had been named after Juan Francisco de la Bodega y Quadra—mountains named for people taking the form "Mount Person's Name". In 1983 the form was changed back to Quadra Mountain by British Columbia and Alberta, and in 1984 by Parks Canada.

See also
 List of peaks on the British Columbia–Alberta border
 List of mountains in the Canadian Rockies

Further reading

References

Three-thousanders of Alberta
Three-thousanders of British Columbia
Mountains of Banff National Park
Kootenay National Park